Liv Hovde (born 25 October 2005) is an American tennis player.

On the junior tour, Hovde has a career high ITF combined ranking of 3, achieved on 28 November 2022. 
She reached the semifinals of the 2022 Australian Open girls' singles, the quarterfinals of the 2022 French Open girls' singles and was champion of the 2022 Wimbledon girls' singles.

Grand Slam singles performance timeline

ITF Circuit finals

Singles: 2 (2 titles)

Junior Grand Slam finals

Girls' singles: 1 (1 title)

References

External links
 
 

2005 births
Living people
American female tennis players
Grand Slam (tennis) champions in girls' singles
Wimbledon junior champions